Ulka is a Bengali novel by Nihar Ranjan Gupta published in 1959. This is one of the most adapted novel in the Indian film Industry and number of films in various languages were featured based on the plot of Ulka.

Synopsis 
The story centres on an innocent man who desperately attempts to reunite with his family who had abandoned him.

Adaptations 
 Thayi Karulu (1962)
 Meri Surat Teri Ankhen (1963)
 Thayin Karunai (1965)
 Deiva Magan (1969)
Raktha Sambandham (1984)
 Thaayi Mamathe (1985)

External links 
 Ulka in archive

References 

1950s novels
1959 Indian novels
20th-century Indian novels
Indian Bengali-language novels
Indian mystery novels
Indian novels adapted into films
Novels set in British India